The Ministry of Defence is a Zimbabwe Government ministry, responsible for defence and national defence policy. The current incumbent minister is Kembo Mohadi. Victor Mantemadanda holds the portfolio of deputy minister for War Veterans. The Ministry is located in the capital of Harare.

It oversees the following uniformed services:
 Zimbabwe Defence Forces
 Zimbabwe National Army
 Air Force of Zimbabwe
 Zimbabwe Republic Police (joint with Ministry of Home Affairs)

It was established in July 1994 as the combined Zimbabwe Defence Forces Headquarters.

Ministers

Air

See also
Zimbabwe Defence Forces
Zimbabwe National Army
Air Force of Zimbabwe
Zimbabwe Republic Police 
Ministry of Home Affairs (Zimbabwe)

References

External links
 Zimbabwe Ministry of Defence official site

Government of Zimbabwe
Defence Ministers of Zimbabwe
Zimbabwe
Military of Zimbabwe